Dolnik  is a settlement in the administrative district of Gmina Koszęcin, within Lubliniec County, Silesian Voivodeship, in southern Poland.

References

Dolnik